Tatamy is a borough in Northampton County, Pennsylvania. The borough's population was 1,203 as of the 2020 census. Tatamy is part of the Lehigh Valley metropolitan area, which had a population of 861,899 and was the 68th most populous metropolitan area in the U.S. as of the 2020 census. 

The borough is named for Moses Tunda Tatamy, a Native American leader.

Geography

Transportation

No numbered highways serve Tatamy directly. Main thoroughfares through the borough include Main Street and Eighth Street. Pennsylvania Route 33 passes to the west in neighboring Palmer Township.

Demographics

As of the census of 2000, there were 930 people, 352 households, and 267 families residing in the borough. The population density was 1,789.1 people per square mile (690.5/km2). There were 356 housing units at an average density of 684.9 per square mile (264.3/km2). The racial makeup of the borough was 98.49% White, 0.22% African American, 0.32% Native American, 0.11% Asian, 0.43% from other races, and 0.43% from two or more races. Hispanic or Latino of any race were 0.97% of the population.

There were 352 households, out of which 32.4% had children under the age of 18 living with them, 63.6% were married couples living together, 8.2% had a female householder with no husband present, and 24.1% were non-families. 21.0% of all households were made up of individuals, and 10.2% had someone living alone who was 65 years of age or older. The average household size was 2.63 and the average family size was 3.03.

In the borough, the population was spread out, with 24.8% under the age of 18, 6.0% from 18 to 24, 28.9% from 25 to 44, 28.5% from 45 to 64, and 11.7% who were 65 years of age or older. The median age was 40 years. For every 100 females there were 91.0 males. For every 100 females age 18 and over, there were 89.4 males. The median income for a household in the borough was $48,942, and the median income for a family was $55,750. Males had a median income of $38,333 versus $26,797 for females. The per capita income for the borough was $21,759. About 2.9% of families and 3.8% of the population were below the poverty line, including 6.2% of those under age 18 and 5.0% of those age 65 or over.

Public education 
Tatamy is served by the Nazareth Area School District. High school students attend Nazareth Area High School in Nazareth.

References

1893 establishments in Pennsylvania
Boroughs in Northampton County, Pennsylvania
Boroughs in Pennsylvania
Populated places established in 1790